The Škoda 19 cm vz. 1904 was a naval gun of the Austro-Hungarian Empire that was used by the Austro-Hungarian Navy during the World War I. The 19 cm vz. 1904 was also used by the Italian Navy and Italian Army as coastal artillery during World War II.  The Italians referred to it as the 190/39.

Construction 
The Škoda 19 cm vz. 1904 was developed and built by Škoda at the Pilsen works.  These guns used Krupp horizontal sliding breech blocks with separate loading metallic cased charges and projectiles. Unlike other large naval guns of the time which used separate loading bagged charges and ammunition, the 19 cm vz. 1904 used separate loading ammunition with charges inside of a brass cartridge case to provide obturation.

History 
The Škoda 19 cm vz. 1904 was used as secondary armament on the  battleships and the armored cruiser . They were mounted on either pedestal mounts in single casemates amidships or in single turrets. Between 1920 and 1921 these ships except SMS Erzherzog Karl were delivered to Italy for scrapping. The exact number of guns used for coastal defense during World War II is unknown. Coastal batteries are believed to have been located at Šibenik, Pula, Naples and Tripoli.

Number of guns salvaged: 
 12 guns each from the two Erzherzog Karl-class battleships
 5 guns from SMS Sankt GeorgTotal = 29 guns

Location and numbers of coastal batteries: 
 2 batteries of 2 guns – Šibenik 
 2 batteries of 2 guns – Pula 
 2 batteries of 2 guns – Naples 
 2 batteries of 4 guns – Tripoli 
 2 guns on pontoon GM269Total = 20 guns

Ammunition 

Ammunition types:
 Armor piercing – Length: , Weight: 
 Common pointed- Length: , Weight: 
 Shrapnel – Length: , Weight:

Photo gallery
Photos of the Tripoli battery from the Italian State Archive.

Notes

References 
 

190 mm artillery
World War I naval weapons
Naval guns of Austria-Hungary
World War I artillery of Austria-Hungary
Naval guns of Italy
World War II artillery of Italy
Coastal artillery